Mario Alberto Aibekob (born 15 July 1990) is an Indonesian professional footballer who plays as a forward for Liga 2 club Kalteng Putra.

Club career

Sriwijaya
He was signed for Sriwijaya to play in Liga 2 in the 2020 season. This season was suspended on 27 March 2020 due to the COVID-19 pandemic. The season was abandoned and was declared void on 20 January 2021.

Semen Padang
In 2021, Mario Aibekob signed a contract with Indonesian Liga 2 club Semen Padang. He made his league debut on 6 October against PSPS Riau at the Gelora Sriwijaya Stadium, Palembang.

International careers
He made his international debut for the Indonesia national team on 31 January 2013 in the friendly match against Jordan.

References

External links

Mario Aibekob at Liga Indonesia

Living people
1990 births
People from Biak Numfor Regency
Association football forwards
Indonesian footballers
Indonesia international footballers
Indonesian Premier Division players
Liga 1 (Indonesia) players
PSBS Biak Numfor players
Persiram Raja Ampat players
Indonesian expatriate footballers
Sportspeople from Papua